Michael Nigro is an American politician and a member of the Democratic Party who has served in the Vermont House of Representatives since 2021.

Nigro serves on the House Committee on Commerce and Economic Development.

References

External links

21st-century American politicians
Living people
Democratic Party members of the Vermont House of Representatives
Year of birth missing (living people)
State University of New York at Geneseo alumni
Plymouth State University alumni